Ithubaaru is a 1987 Maldivian drama film directed by Hussain Shihab and Hassan Najumee. The film stars Mohamed Rasheed, Mariyam Rasheedha, Ahmed Sharmeel and Haajara Abdul Kareem in pivotal roles.

Premise
Latheefa (Mariyam Rasheedha) who was studying in Male' is forcibly brought into her step-mother's house after her father's dismissal. Since then, Latheefa is continuously abused and traumatized by her step-mother, Khadheeja (Haajara Abdul Kareem) and step-sister, depriving her from education and restricting her from attending social gatherings.

Cast 
 Mohamed Rasheed as Riyaz
 Mariyam Rasheedha as Latheefa
 Haajara Abdul Kareem as Khadheeja
 Ahmed Sharmeel as Atheef
 Khadheeja
 Khadheeja Ahmed
 Shaugee Abdulla
 Junaid Saud
 Rafeeq
 Afrah
 Hussain Rasheed
 Hamid

Soundtrack

References

1987 films
Maldivian drama films
1987 drama films
Dhivehi-language films